Anita Johnson Mackey (born January 1, 1914) is an American social worker who, in 1953, became the first African-American supervisor at the VA’s Los Angeles outpatient clinic.

Biography
Mackey was born in Riverside, California) The granddaughter of an emancipated slave, Mackey was one of eight children. Her mother died when she was ten so an older sister raised her along with their father.

After she married Harvey Mackey in 1937, she taught first grade until she attended the University of Chicago School of Social Service Administration. She graduated in 1941. (her undergraduate degree in speech was from the University of Redlands, class of 1937).

After working for the American Red Cross and then the Veterans Administration, she retired from the VA in 1976. When the VA opened a location in Santa Barbara, California, she moved there in 1964 to work.

Mackey has been a Seventh Day Adventist since she was 23. Church missions and travels with her husband have taken her to more than 100 countries.

Awards and honors
Some of her awards are the Santa Barbara Council on Social Services Award for Distinguished Service in 1972; Honorary Doctor of Humane Letters Andrews University; Honorary Member Delta Kappa.

References

1914 births
American social workers
Living people
People from Riverside, California
University of Chicago School of Social Service Administration alumni
University of Redlands alumni
American Seventh-day Adventist missionaries
People from Santa Barbara, California
African-American centenarians
American centenarians
Women centenarians